Darius S. Smith (August 19, 1833 – September 14, 1913) was a South Dakota politician.

On May 20, 1862, he married Adelia M. Williams. Their daughter, Sylvia, would marry Joseph H. Bottum, later also a member of the South Dakota Senate. Sylvia and Joseph's son, Joseph H. Bottum, would become Lieutenant Governor of South Dakota and a member of the United States Senate. Writer Joseph Bottum and musician Roddy Bottum are his great-great-grandsons.

Smith died on September 14, 1913.

Career
Smith was a member of the South Dakota Senate from 1895 to 1896. Additionally, he was a county commissioner of Faulk County, South Dakota and a justice of the peace. He was a Republican.

See also
Members of the South Dakota State Senate

References

External links

The Political Graveyard

People from Faulk County, South Dakota
Republican Party South Dakota state senators
American justices of the peace
1833 births
1913 deaths
Burials in South Dakota
19th-century American judges